Thomas Gray (1913–1992) was a Scottish footballer and manager.

Career
Gray, a former Dundee player, became Dundee United's third manager in the space of eight weeks when he was appointed in March 1957. At the time he was the part-time manager of Arbroath, then several places above United in Division Two. On being invited by United to take over as manager, he undertook to accept only if he was allowed to do it on a part-time basis. The arrangement was not a success and in October 1958, after eighteen months, Gray resigned. Gray later became a part-time scout for Rangers.

References

1913 births
1992 deaths
Scottish footballers
Dundee F.C. players
Arbroath F.C. players
Arbroath F.C. managers
Scottish football managers
Dundee United F.C. managers
Scottish Football League managers
Scottish Football League players
Greenock Morton F.C. players
Association football central defenders